The Four Villages Half Marathon is an annual road running event held during January in Cheshire, United Kingdom. The race is organised by Helsby Running Club.
The event's course passes through the villages of Dunham on the Hill, Mouldsworth, Manley, Alvanley and Helsby.

History
The race was started in 1982 by staff from BICC, a manufacturing firm formerly located in Helsby. The race was inspired by the first London Marathon (which had been held on 29 March 1981), as well as to raise money to send a terminally ill local lad on the trip of a lifetime to Disneyland.

The original route was through the four villages of Thornton-le-Moors, Ince, Elton and Helsby. In 1999, the course was changed to a similar course to the current (with some adjustments along the way), passing Dunham-on-the-Hill, Mouldsworth, Manley and Helsby.

Winners

References

External links
 Official website

Half marathons in the United Kingdom
Sport in Cheshire
January sporting events